Carl Hagenbeck (10 June 1844 – 14 April 1913) was a German merchant of wild animals who supplied many European zoos, as well as P. T. Barnum.  He created the modern zoo with animal enclosures without bars that were closer to their natural habitat. The transformation of the zoo architecture initiated by him is known as the Hagenbeck revolution. Hagenbeck founded Germany's most successful privately owned zoo, the Tierpark Hagenbeck, which moved to its present location in Hamburg's Stellingen district in 1907.  He was also an ethnography showman and a pioneer in displaying humans next to animals in human zoos.

Biography 
Hagenbeck was born on 10 June 1844, to Claus Gottfried Carl Hagenbeck (1810–1887), a fishmonger who ran a side business buying, showing, and selling exotic animals.

When Hagenbeck was 14, his father gave him some seals and a polar bear. He took a more proactive role in the animal trade and his collection of animals grew until he needed large buildings to keep them. Hagenbeck left his home in Hamburg to accompany hunters and explorers on trips to jungle regions and snow-clad mountains. He captured animals in nearly every continent in the world. In 1874, he decided to exhibit Samoan and Sámi people (then known as Laplanders) as "purely natural" populations, with their tents, weapons, sleds, near a group of reindeer.

In 1875, Hagenbeck began to exhibit his animals in all the large cities of Europe as well as in the United States, merging his interests in commercial success, the preservation and "acclimatization" of animals, and bringing the "exotic" to industrializing countries.

In 1876, he sent a collaborator to the Egyptian Sudan to bring back some wild beasts and Nubians. The Nubian exhibit was a success in Europe, and toured Paris, London, and Berlin. In 1880, his agent Johan Adrian Jacobsen recruited a group of eight Labrador Inuit. The group toured Hamburg, Berlin, Prague, Frankfurt, Darmstadt, Krefeld and Paris. One member of the group, Abraham Ulrikab, kept a diary during his travels in Europe. All eight Inuit were killed by smallpox.

Hagenbeck's exhibit of human beings, considered as "savages in a natural state" was the probable source of inspiration for Albert Geoffroy Saint-Hilaire's similar "human zoo" exhibition in the Jardin d'acclimatation in Paris. Saint-Hilaire organized in 1877 two "ethnological exhibitions", presenting Nubians and Greenlandic Inuit to the public, thereby doubling the number of visitors of the zoo.

Hagenbeck also trained animals for his circuses at the World's Columbian Exposition in Chicago, Illinois, in 1893, and the Louisiana Purchase Exposition in St. Louis in 1904. 
Hagenbeck's circus was one of the most popular attractions. His collection included large animals and reptiles. Many of the animals were trained to do tricks. The circus that Hagenbeck assembled for the Louisiana Purchase Expo was purchased and merged into the B. E. Wallace Circus as the Hagenbeck–Wallace Circus. Hagenbeck's trained animals also performed at amusement parks in New York City's Coney Island before 1914.

Hagenbeck planned a permanent exhibit where animals could live in surroundings like their natural homes.  Despite the existence of the Zoological Garden of Hamburg, Hagenbeck opened his great zoo, the Tierpark Hagenbeck at Stellingen, near Hamburg in 1907.

In 1909–1910 he supervised the building of the Giardino Zoologico in Rome. Today his ideas are followed by most large zoos.

In 1905, Hagenbeck used his skills as an animal collector to capture a thousand camels for the German Empire for use in Africa. He described his adventures and his methods of capturing and training animals in his book Beasts and Men, published in 1909.

Hagenbeck was one of the first Europeans to describe a creature that came to be known as Mokele-mbembe. In  Beasts and Men Hagenbeck claimed he had received reports of "a huge monster, half elephant, half dragon" inhabiting the interior of Rhodesia. Hagenbeck thought the animal was some kind of dinosaur similar to a brontosaurus and unsuccessfully searched for it. His claim made headlines in newspapers around the world and helped launch the legend of Mokele Mbembe.

Hagenbeck died on 14 April 1913 in Hamburg from a bite by a snake, probably a boomslang. After Hagenbeck's death, his sons Heinrich and Lorenz continued the zoo and circus business; the Hamburg zoo still retains his name.

See also 
Hagenbeck–Wallace Circus, a circus which incorporated the American one founded by Hagenbeck
Salt and Sauce, United Kingdom elephants originally bought and imported by Carl Hagenbeck

References

Further reading

Carl Hagenbeck, Beasts and men. Being Carl Hagenbeck's experiences for half a century among wild animals. (London & New York: Longmans, Green, and Co., 1912).
Eric Ames, Carl Hagenbeck's Empire of Entertainments (Seattle and London: University of Washington Press, 2009)
Edward Alexander, "Carl Hagenbeck and His Stellingen Tierpark: The Moated Zoo," in: Edward Alexander, Museum Masters: Their Museums and Their Influence. (Nashville: American Association for State and Local History, 1983), pp. 311–340.
Andreas Daum, Wissenschaftspopularisierung im 19. Jahrhundert: Bürgerliche Kultur, naturwissenschaftliche Bildung und die deutsche Öffentlichkeit, 1848–1914. Munich: Oldenbourg, 1998, .
Herman Reichenbach, "A Tale of Two Zoos: The Hamburg Zoological Garden and Carl Hagenbeck's Tierpark" in: R. J. Hoage and William A. Deiss, eds. New Worlds, New Animals. (Baltimore: Johns Hopkins University Press, 1996), pp. 51–62.
 excerpt
Reptiles of the world by Raymond L. Ditmar talks about him capturing most of the Gavhrials found on exhibit.
Spartaco Gippoliti 2004 Carl Hagenbeck's plan for Rome Zoo - and what became of it. Int. Zoo News 51: 24-28.

External links

Karl Hagenbeck: Von Tieren und Menschen. Ausgabe von 1909. Digitalisat der University of Toronto.
Hagenbeck, Carl (1909) Beasts and Men, being Carl Hagenbeck's experiences for half a century among wild animals (English translation) - digital facsimile from Linda Hall Library
 

1844 births
1913 deaths
Businesspeople from Hamburg
Animal trainers
Deaths due to snake bites
Ringling Bros. and Barnum & Bailey Circus
Circus owners
Burials at the Ohlsdorf Cemetery
Lion tamers
Zoo owners
Animal traders